The SPIE Internationale Junioren Driedaagse van Axel is a junior (ages 17-18) multi-day cycling race held annually in the Netherlands. It was part of the UCI Junior World Cup from 1993 to 2007.

Winners

References

External links

Cycle races in the Netherlands
Recurring sporting events established in 1982
1982 establishments in the Netherlands]